Kirkwood (population: 90)is a Canadian rural community in Northumberland County, New Brunswick.

It is situated along the Southwest Miramichi River.

History

Notable people

See also
List of communities in New Brunswick

References

Communities in Northumberland County, New Brunswick